The 1972 AFC Youth Championship was held in Bangkok, Thailand.

Teams
The following teams entered the tournament:

 
 
 
 
 
 
 
 
 
 
 
 
 
 
 
 
  (host)

Note:  also entered, but withdrew before the draw.

Group stage

Group A

Group B

Group C

Group D

Quarterfinals

Semifinals

Third place match

Final

Notes

External links
Results by RSSSF
1972 AFC Youth Championship 

AFC U-19 Championship
1972 in Thai sport
Sport in Bangkok
1972 in Asian football
AFC
International association football competitions hosted by Thailand
1972 in youth association football